Our Lady of the Valley High School was a Catholic high school in Orange in Essex County, New Jersey, United States, that operated under the supervision of the Roman Catholic Archdiocese of Newark.

The school closed in June 1981.

Athletics
The boys basketball team won the Non-Public Group C state championship in 1970 (vs. St. Joseph's High School of Toms River) and won the Non-Public B title in 1979 (vs. St Joseph's of Toms River).

The baseball team won the Non-Public Group B state championship in 1977, defeating St. John Vianney High School in the tournament final.

Notable alumni
 John B. Duff (1931-2013), historian who served as the 8th President of Columbia College Chicago.
 Richard Codey (born 1946), politician who has served in the New Jersey Senate and as Governor of New Jersey.
 Brian Hill (born 1947, class of 1965), retired American basketball coach.
 James T. McHugh (1932-2000), prelate of the Roman Catholic Church who served as Bishop of Camden (1989–98) and Bishop of Rockville Centre (2000).

Notable faculty
 Richie Adubato (born 1937), former basketball coach in the NBA for the Detroit Pistons, Dallas Mavericks and Orlando Magic, who coached the basketball team at Our Valley in 1964 and 1965.

References

1981 disestablishments in New Jersey
Orange, New Jersey
High schools in Essex County, New Jersey
Private high schools in Essex County, New Jersey
Roman Catholic Archdiocese of Newark
Catholic secondary schools in New Jersey